Birmingham Perry Barr is a constituency in the West Midlands, represented in the House of Commons of the UK Parliament since 2001 by Khalid Mahmood of the Labour Party.

Constituency profile
UK Polling Report stated in 2015: "Perry Barr and parts of Handworth Wood are relatively affluent and Oscott is a large, mostly white, inter-war housing development. The most notorious part of the seat is Handsworth, a tough, multi-ethnic, inner-city area." This area, however, was only added to the seat in 1983, following the abolition of the Birmingham Handsworth constituency.

Members of Parliament

Boundaries 

The constituency covers a broad area of north-west Birmingham.

2010–present: The City of Birmingham wards of Handsworth Wood, Lozells and East Handsworth, Oscott, Perry Barr, Birchfield

1997–2010: The City of Birmingham wards of Handsworth, Oscott, Perry Barr, and Sandwell.

1983–1997: The City of Birmingham wards of Handsworth, Kingstanding, Oscott, and Perry Barr.

1974–1983: The County Borough of Birmingham wards of Kingstanding, Oscott, and Perry Barr.

1950–1974: The County Borough of Birmingham wards of Kingstanding and Perry Barr.

Elections

Elections in the 2010s

Elections in the 2000s

Elections in the 1990s

Elections in the 1980s

Elections in the 1970s

Elections in the 1960s

Elections in the 1950s

See also
List of parliamentary constituencies in the West Midlands (county)

Notes

References

External links 
 Birmingham city council constituency page

Parliamentary constituencies in Birmingham, West Midlands
Constituencies of the Parliament of the United Kingdom established in 1950
Perry Barr